The de Sausmarez Baronetcy, of Jerbourg in the Island of Guernsey, was a title in the Baronetage of the United Kingdom.

It was created on 26 June 1928 for Havilland de Sausmarez who had been a judge of various British courts in Africa, the Ottoman Empire and China.

The title became extinct upon the death of Sir Havilland Walter de Sausmarez in 1941.

de Sausmarez baronets, of Jerburg (1928)
Sir Havilland Walter de Sausmarez, 1st Baronet (1861–1941)

References

External links
 
 Portrait of Sir Havilland Walter de Sausmarez

Extinct baronetcies in the Baronetage of the United Kingdom
Anglo-Normans
Sausmarez family (Guernsey)